Bull riding is a rodeo sport that involves a rider getting on a bucking bull and attempting to stay mounted while the animal tries to buck off the rider.

American bull riding has been called "the most dangerous eight seconds in sports." To receive a score, the rider must stay on top of the bull for eight seconds with the use of one hand gripped on a bull rope tied behind the bull's forelegs. Touching the bull or themselves with the free hand, or failing to reach the eight-second mark, results in a no-score ride. Depending on the bull riding organization and the contest, up to four judges might judge the rider and four judge the bull on their performance. For most organizations, a perfect score is 100 points. In general, most professional riders score in the neighborhood of the mid-70s to the high 80s.

Outside of the United States, bull riding traditions with varying rules and histories also exist in Canada, Mexico, Belize, Guatemala, El Salvador, Honduras, Nicaragua, Costa Rica, Panama, Cuba, the Dominican Republic, Colombia, Venezuela, Guyana, Ecuador, Peru, Bolivia, Brazil, Paraguay, Chile, Argentina, Uruguay, the Philippines, Japan, South Africa, England, Germany, France, Italy, Spain, Portugal, Australia and New Zealand with the majority of them following similar rules, especially with the Professional Bull Riders (PBR) organization.

History

The taming of bulls has ancient roots in contests dating as far back as Minoan culture. Bull riding itself has its direct roots in Mexican contests of equestrian and ranching skills now collectively known as charreada.  During the 16th century, a hacienda contest called jaripeo developed.  Originally considered a variant of bull fighting, in which riders literally rode a bull to death, the competition evolved into a form where the bull was simply ridden until it stopped bucking. By the mid-19th century, charreada competition was popular on Texas and California cattle ranches where Anglo and Hispanic ranch hands often worked together.

Scottish noblewoman Frances Erskine Inglis, 1st Marquise of Calderón de la Barca witnessed Bull Riding while living in Mexico in 1840, and wrote about it in her book Life in Mexico (1843):

Many early Texas rangers, who had to be expert horse riders and later went on to become ranchers, learned and adapted Hispanic techniques and traditions to ranches in the United States. Many also enjoyed traditional Mexican celebrations, and H. L. Kinney, a rancher, promoter and former Texas Ranger staged what is thought to be the first Anglo-American organized bullfight in the southwest in 1852.  This event also included a jaripeo competition and was the subject of newspaper reports from as far away as the New Orleans Daily Delta. However, popular sentiment shifted away from various blood sports and both bullfighting and prize fighting were banned by the Texas legislature in 1891. In the same time period, however, Wild West Shows began to add steer riding to their exhibitions, choosing to use castrated animals because steers were easier to handle and transport than bulls. Additionally, informal rodeos began as competitions between neighboring ranches in the American Old West.  The location of the first formal rodeo is debated.  Deer Trail, Colorado claims the first rodeo was in 1869, but so does Cheyenne, Wyoming in 1872.

Although steer riding contests existed into the 1920s, the sport did not gain popularity until bulls were returned to the arena and replaced steers as the mount of choice. The first-known rodeo to use brahma bulls was in Columbia, Mississippi, produced in 1935 by Canadian brothers Earl and Weldon Bascom with Jake Lybbert and Waldo Ross. This rodeo was the first to feature a bull riding event at a night rodeo held outdoors under electric lights. A pivotal moment for modern bull riding, and rodeo in general, came with the founding of the Rodeo Cowboy Association (RCA) in 1936, which later became the Professional Rodeo Cowboys Association (PRCA). Through this organization, many hundreds of rodeos are held each year. Since that time, the popularity of all aspects of the rodeo has risen. In addition to the PRCA, which has PRCA ProRodeo with bull riding and the Xtreme Bulls events for bull riding only, there is the Professional Bull Riders (PBR), which has staged events since 1993. The organization’s championship event, the PBR World Finals, took place in Las Vegas, Nevada for nearly 30 years. As of 2022, it now takes place in Fort Worth, Texas.  The PBR's major league tour, titled the Unleash the Beast Series since 2018, is televised on CBS Sports Network, with the primary broadcast network televising selected bonus rounds (known as 15/15 bucking battles). The major league tour was previously known as the Bud Light Cup Series from 1994 to 2002, then the Built Ford Tough Series from 2003 to 2017. From these roots, bull riding as a competitive sport has spread to a number of other nations worldwide.

Rules and regulations

Each bull has a unique name and number called a brand used to help identify it.  A sufficient number of bulls, each judged to be of good strength, health, agility, and age, are selected to perform.  The rider and bull are matched randomly before the competition, although starting in 2008, some ranked riders are allowed to choose their own bulls from a bull draft for selected rounds in PBR events. In more recent times, bulls must have the tips of their horns  shaved off and filed down so they are not sharp.

A rider mounts a bull and grips a flat braided rope. After they secure a good grip on the rope, the rider nods to signal they are ready. The bucking chute (a small enclosure which opens from the side) is opened and the bull storms out into the arena. The rider must attempt to stay on the bull for at least eight seconds, while only touching the bull with their riding hand. The other hand must remain free for the duration of the ride.  Originally, the rules required a 10-second ride, but that was changed to the current eight seconds.

The bull bucks, rears, kicks, spins, and twists in an effort to throw the rider off. This continues for a number of seconds until the rider is bucked off of the bull or dismounts after completing the ride. A loud buzzer or whistle announces the completion of an eight-second ride.

Throughout the ride, bullfighters, previously known as rodeo clowns, stay near the bull to aid the rider if necessary. When the ride ends, either intentionally or not, the bullfighters distract the bull to protect the rider from harm. The bull then exits the arena via the exit chute. If he refuses to leave, then the wrangler on horseback ropes the bull and takes him into the exit chute so the next rider can go.

Many competitions have a format that involves multiple rounds, sometimes called "go-rounds". Generally, events span two to three nights. The rider is given a chance to ride one bull per night. The total points scored by the end of the event are recorded, and after the first or first two go-rounds, the top 20 riders are given a chance to ride one more bull. This final round is called the "short go" or sometimes it is called the championship round. After the end of the short go, the rider with the most total points wins the event. A rider who  had a disturbance during his or her ride can go to the judges himself and ask for a reride. The bull can fall, another bull gets out, someone interfered, or the bull did not buck are all reasons why a rider can be given a reride. With rerides they all run different. Either you get the same bull or one will be drawn for you at random.

Points and scoring
Scoring is done consistently within a rodeo organization. The two largest sanctioning bodies are the PRCA and PBR. They vary slightly in how they score bull rides. There are many other organizations, and each has its own particular rules on how they score, but most follow rules similar to the PRCA. The rider only scores points if he successfully rides the bull for eight seconds. The bull is always given a score. In the PRCA, a ride is scored from 0–100 points. Both the rider and the bull are awarded points. In the regular season, there are four judges, two judges scoring the bull's effort from 0–25 points, and two judges scoring the rider's performance from 0-25 points. There is the potential for the rider and the bull to earn up to 50 points each. The two scores are added together for a total ride score of up to 100 points. This system was spearheaded by former PRCA president Dale Smith. Scores of zero are quite common, as many riders lose control of the animal almost immediately after the bull leaves the bucking chute. Many experienced professionals are able to earn scores of 75 or more. Scores above 80 are considered excellent, and a score in the 90s exceptional.

In the PBR, a ride is scored from 0-100 points in total. Up to 50 points is scored for the rider and 50 points for the bull. The rider only scores points if he successfully rides the bull for 8 seconds. The bull is always given a score. Four judges award a score of up to 25 points each for the rider's performance, and four judges award up to 25 points each for the bull's effort. Then all the scores are combined and then the total is divided in half for the official score.

Judges award points based on several key aspects of the ride. Bull riding rules require for judges to be former bull riders themselves. They look for constant control and rhythm in the rider in matching their movements with the bull. Points are usually deducted if a rider is constantly off balance. For points actually to be awarded, the rider must stay mounted for a minimum of 8 seconds, and they are scored only for actions during those 8 seconds. The ability to control the bull well allows riders to gain extra style points. These are often gained by spurring the animal. A rider is disqualified for touching the bull, the rope, or themself with their free arm.

Bulls have more raw power and a different style of movement from bucking horses. One move particular to bulls is a belly roll ("sunfishing"), in which the bull is completely off the ground and kicks either his hind feet or all four feet to the side in a twisting, rolling motion. Bulls also are more likely than horses to spin in tight, quick circles, and are less likely to run or to jump extremely high ("break in two").

For the bull, judges look at the animal's overall agility, power and speed; his back legs kick, and his front end drops. In general, if a bull gives a rider a very hard time, more points will be awarded. If a rider fails to stay mounted for at least 8 seconds, the bull is still awarded a score. The PBR and PRCA record bulls' past scores so that the best bulls can be brought to the finals, ensuring that riders will be given a chance to score highly. Both organizations award one bull an award for the best bull of the year, decided by bull scores in both buckoffs and successful qualified rides. The award brings prestige to the ranch at which the bull was raised.

If a rider scores sufficiently low due to poor bull performance, the judges may offer the rider the option of a re-ride. By taking the option, the rider gives up the score received, waits until all other riders have ridden, and rides again. This can be risky because the rider loses their score and risks being bucked off and receiving no score. A re-ride may also be given if a bull stumbles or runs into the fence or gate.

In some PBR events that use an elimination style bracket, if both riders in a bracket fail to reach eight seconds, the rider who lasts longer advances to the next round.  Otherwise, the rider with a higher score advances.

Equipment

Bull riders use many pieces of equipment both functionally and to ensure maximum safety, both to themselves and to the animals 
involved.

Bull rope
The primary piece of equipment used is the bull rope. It is a braided rope made of  polypropylene, grass, or some combination. A handle is braided into the center of the rope and is usually stiffened with leather. One side of the rope is tied in an adjustable knot that can be changed for the size of bull. The other side of the rope (the tail) is a flat braid and is usually coated with rosin to keep it from sliding through the rider's hand. A metallic bell is strapped to the knot and hangs directly under the bull throughout the ride. In addition to the sound the bell produces, it also gives the rope some weight, allowing it to fall off the bull once a rider has dismounted.

Chaps
Chaps are probably the most noticeable piece of bull rider clothing, as their distinctive coloring and patterns add flair to the sport. Usually made of leather, chaps also provide protection for the rider's legs and thighs.

Vest
Bull riders wear a protective vest which is made of high density foam that allows the shock to disperse over a wide area, thereby reducing pain and injury. The vest’s foam is covered with a ballistic material called Spectra, similar to Kevlar. It is then covered up with leather, giving it a western look. 

Bull rider Cody Lambert was inspired to create a protective vest for fellow riders after witnessing the fatal injury of his friend and 1987 PRCA world champion bull rider, Lane Frost who died at the 1989 Cheyenne Frontier Days rodeo. After successfully riding his bull during the championship round, Frost dismounted and landed in the muddy arena floor. The bull then turned and pressed a horn against Frost’s back and pushed him against the mud, breaking several of his ribs. Frost got up and took a few steps towards the bucking chutes and signaled for help. He then collapsed, causing some of the broken ribs to puncture his heart and lungs. He died on the arena floor before he could be transported to the hospital. 

Lambert based the bull riding protective vest on the one worn by his brother who was a horse jockey. He debuted the vest at the California Rodeo Salinas in the summer of 1993, and for several months, he was the only bull rider using one. It was not until the spring of 1994 when other contestants began riding with vests. The number of bull riders with vests grew over the months, and by the autumn of that year, the vast majority of riders were using them. They were officially made mandatory for all contestants by 1996. Some bull riding vests also include a neck roll for protection to the neck, although very few riders use a vest with said modification.

Glove
To prevent a rope burn, riders must wear a protective glove, usually made of leather. It must be fastened to the rider's hand since the force the animal is able to exert could easily tear it away. The rider often applies rosin to the glove, which allows for additional grip.

Boots
Cowboy boots are worn with blunted and loosely locked spurs help keep the rider balanced and is crucial piece of equipment to the sport as a whole. The bulls are unharmed by the rowels, as their hide is roughly seven times thicker than a human being's skin. Truly skilled riders will often spur the bull in the hope of achieving extra style points from the judges.

Mouthguard
Many riders wear mouthguards, which are optional at the professional level.

Headgear
For most of bull riding’s history, the primary headgear worn by contestants was cowboy hats. However, things started to slowly change during the latter years of the 20th century. Among the earliest bull riders to use protective headgear was 1982 PRCA world champion, Charlie Sampson. At a rodeo during the latter part of the 1983 PRCA regular season, Sampson suffered a major wreck that cracked his skull and fractured nearly every bone in his face. As a result, he had reconstructive surgery. When the regular season ended, he had won enough money to qualify for the National Finals Rodeo in Oklahoma City in December. Against doctors’ recommendations, he decided to compete at the event. However, his face was still recovering, so he rode at the event with a lacrosse helmet and a neck roll. When his face was healed up, Sampson went back to riding in a cowboy hat. However, he would suffer additional facial injuries throughout the rest of his career and rode with a helmet if his injuries were severe enough to warrant it. He would always go back to riding in a hat when healed up and never made a helmet a permanent part of his gear. 

Into the 1990s, a small number of other professional bull riders began using protective headgear such as leather face masks with metal bars that they wore under their hats while riding or modified ice hockey helmets. Like Charlie Sampson, most of these riders only wore headgear while recovering from serious facial or head injuries, only to ditch it when healed up. Very few bull riders made protective headwear a permanent part of their gear. However, by 2003, though still a minority, helmeted bull riders were more common than ever. Many were now riders that did not necessarily suffer serious injuries, but who grew up riding with them for the sake of extra safety. The number of contestants who rode with helmets grew throughout the rest of the 2000s, especially during the latter years of the decade. 

By the early 2010s, manufacturers were building helmets made specifically for bull riding. Around the same time, most up-and-comers were already riding with helmets. In 2013, the PBR made it mandatory that all contestants at their events who were born on or after October 15, 1994 ride with a full bull riding helmet. Those born before that date were grandfathered in and permitted to ride with a protective face mask underneath their hat or simply with their hat if so desired.

Public health researchers found evidence suggesting that bull riding helmets are protective, when riders wearing one particular type of helmet suffered approximately 50% fewer head and facial injuries.

In 2004, at the 1st International Rodeo Research and Clinical Care Conference in Calgary, Alberta, Canada, the licensed rodeo and bull riding medical personnel and clinicians recommended to the rodeo and bull riding associations mentioned in the agreement the mandatory use of helmets to all youth bull riders and the recommendation of helmets to all adult bull riders.

For competitors under the age of 18, mandatory protective headgear incorporating an ice hockey-style helmet is worn. Riders who use helmets as youths tend to continue wearing them as they reach adulthood and turn professional.

Bull equipment

Flank strap
The flank strap is a soft cotton rope at least 5/8" in diameter and is used without extra padding like sheepskin or neoprene.  It is tied around the bull's flank. Contrary to popular belief, the flank strap is not tied around the bull's testicles. This rope is to encourage the bull to use his hind legs more in a bucking motion, as this is a true test of a rider's skill in maintaining the ride. The flank strap causes the bull to buck in motions such as bucking side to side, jumping up and down, or kicking its legs in the air in a circular motion. If it is applied improperly a rider may request to ride again, as the bull will not buck well if the flank strap is too tight.  The flank strap is applied by the stock contractor or his designate.

The arena
The arenas used in professional bull riding vary.  Some are rodeo arenas that are used only for bull riding and other rodeo events.  Others are event centers that play host to many different sports.  Common to all arenas is a large, open area that gives the bulls, bull riders, and bull fighters plenty of room to maneuver.  The area is fenced,  6 to 7 feet high or more, to protect the audience from escaped bulls. The fencing of the arena is metal fencing that has metal rods across it so that when the bulls buck and kick the fence they do not bust the fence and end up in the crowd. This is a safety feature.  There are generally exits on each corner of the arena for riders to get out of the way quickly.  Riders can also hop onto the fence to avoid danger.  One end of the arena contains the bucking chutes from which the bulls are released. An arena usually contains two to four bucking chutes. Especially for big events to keep it flowing the nights of the events. They load the bulls into all two to four chutes releasing one at a time. There is also an exit chute where the bulls can exit the arena. Also in the arena there will be two to four guys mounted on horses with roped and chaps on to rope the bulls and take them into the exit chute to help keep all people in the arena safe and keep the show moving. These guys or girls will lasso the bull around the head and neck and pull them into the exit chute where one of the workers will open the exit chute and put the bull back.

North America
In the United States and Canada, most professional bull riders start out riding in high school rodeo or other junior associations. From there, riders may go on the college rodeo circuit or to one of several national or regional semi-professional associations including the Southern Extreme Bull Riding Association (SEBRA), the National Federation of Professional Bull Riders (NFPB), the International Bull Riders Association (IBR), the Professional Championship Bull Riders Tour (PCB), the American Bull Riders Tour (ABT), Bull Riders Canada (BRC), the International Professional Rodeo Association (IPRA), the Cowboys Professional Rodeo Association (CPRA), the United Professional Rodeo Association (UPRA), the Southern Rodeo Association (SRA), the Professional Western Rodeo Association (PWRA), the Canadian Cowboys Association (CCA), among others. Bull riders compete in these organizations as they are climbing the ladder to the professional ranks and to supplement their income.

In Mexico, there are a number of American-style bull riding organizations. The three main professional ones include PBR Mexico, Cuernos Chuecos (Crooked Horns), and La Federacion Mexicana de Rodeo (The Mexican Rodeo Federation). The latter of which is Mexico's top organization that includes all of American Rodeo's standard events, including bull riding. There are also a number of regional semi-pro associations.

Professional bull riders can win in excess of $100,000 a year while competing in either the PBR or PRCA circuits.

Australia and New Zealand
There are approximately 200 rodeos and bushmen's carnivals held annually across Australia. At most of these events bull riding is one of the featured competitions.

Initially bullocks and steers were used for roughriding events and these were owned by local graziers that lent them for these events. Nowadays bulls are used for the open events and stock contractors supply the various roughriding associations. Contract stock has produced a more uniform range of bucking stock which is also quieter to handle. The competitions are run and scored in a similar style to that used in the United States.

In May 1992, the National Rodeo Council of Australia (NRCA) was formed to promote and further the sport of rodeo and has represented the following associations, which also control bull riding:
Australian Bushmen's Campdraft & Rodeo Association (ABCRA)
Australian Professional Bull Riders Association (APBA)
Central Rodeo Cowboys Association (CRCA)
Indigenous Rodeo Riders Australia (IRRA)
National Student Rodeo Association (NSRA)
National Rodeo Association (NRA)
Northern Cowboys Association (NCA)
Queensland Rodeo Association (QRA)
Rodeo Services Association (RSA)
West Coast Rodeo Circuit (WCRC)

There are strict standards for the selection, care and treatment of rodeo livestock, arenas, plus equipment requirements and specifications.

Chainsaw was one of Australia's most famous bucking bulls. Only nine contestants scored on him and he won the Australian national title of Bull of the Year a world record eight times during 1987 to 1994.

Some of Australia's best bull riders travel and compete internationally in Canada, New Zealand and the United States. Some of Australia's leading bull riders conduct bull riding clinics to assist learners and novice riders.

A World Challenge of Professional Bull Riders (PBR) was held on 29 May 2010 at the Brisbane Entertainment Centre (BEC). The 2010 PBR Finals were held over two nights at the Australian Equine and Livestock Events Centre (AELEC), with five top-ranked professional bull riders from the United States and 25 of Australia's best bull riders contesting the event.

Rodeo is also popular in country regions of New Zealand where approximately 32 rodeos, which include bull riding contests, are held each summer.

See also
Steer riding
Miniature bull riding
Bucking bull
Mutton busting
Mechanical bull
Jaripeo
Jineteada gaucha
Bronc riding

References

Bibliography

External links

Professional Rodeo Cowboys Association
International Professional Rodeo Association
Professional Bull Riders 
Professional Bull Riders: Canada
Professional Bull Riders: Mexico
Professional Bull Riders: Brazil
Professional Bull Riders: Australia
Bull Riders Canada
Circuito Rancho Primavera
Tuff Hedeman Bull Riding Tour

Rodeo events